Bruce Collins may refer to:

 Bruce Dwight Collins (born 1968), American radio host and author
 Bruce Collins (basketball) (born 1958), American basketball player